Harmony Hill Methodist Church is a Methodist Episcopal house of worship affiliated with the United Methodist Church and located about one mile north of the village of Stillwater in Stillwater Township, in the Sussex County, New Jersey.

One of the earliest Methodist congregations organized in both New Jersey and the United States, Harmony Hill Methodist Church was established in 1802 along the Flanders Circuit, a large, nearly 400-mile circuit of several churches in northwestern New Jersey, Southern New York and Pennsylvania that was served by travelling ministers.  The congregation met in its early members' barns and homes until the current structure, a wood-frame building, was erected in 1832–1833.  Its founders were either previously members (including original founders) of the Stillwater Presbyterian Church when that church was affiliated as a joint Lutheran and German Reformed congregation (before 1822), or from descendants of those founders, as the population of Stillwater assimilated from its Palatine German roots to English-oriented American culture.

Harmony Hill Methodist Church was listed on both the New Jersey and National Register of Historic Places in 1977.

Harmony Hill Methodist Cemetery
A cemetery is located adjacent to the Harmony Hill Methodist Church where most of the early parishioners of the church are interred.  Several members of the Main, Savercool, Wintermute and descendants of the early families of Stillwater, New Jersey are buried within the cemetery.

See also
 History of New Jersey
 Paulins Kill
 Stillwater Cemetery
 First Presbyterian Church (Stillwater, New Jersey)

References

External links
 
 Harmony Hill United Methodist Church
 Published burials at the Harmony Hill Methodist Cemetery

Stillwater Township, New Jersey
Palatine German settlement in New Jersey
History of New Jersey
Churches on the National Register of Historic Places in New Jersey
Churches completed in 1833
Churches in Sussex County, New Jersey
History of Methodism in the United States
Religious organizations established in 1802
United Methodist churches in New Jersey
19th-century Methodist church buildings in the United States
1802 establishments in New Jersey
National Register of Historic Places in Sussex County, New Jersey
New Jersey Register of Historic Places